UFC on ESPN: Hermansson vs. Vettori  (also known as UFC on ESPN 19 and UFC Vegas 16) was a mixed martial arts event produced by the Ultimate Fighting Championship that took place on December 5, 2020 at the UFC Apex facility in Enterprise, Nevada, part of the Las Vegas Metropolitan Area, United States.

Background
The promotion was targeting a middleweight bout between former UFC Welterweight Championship challenger Darren Till and Jack Hermansson to serve as the event headliner. However, it was revealed on November 6 that Till was forced to withdraw from the planned bout due to an undisclosed injury. He was replaced by Kevin Holland. In turn, Holland was removed from the contest on November 28 after testing positive for COVID-19. Marvin Vettori, who was expected to face former Strikeforce Middleweight Champion Ronaldo Souza a week later at UFC 256, served as his replacement. The UFC also opted to reschedule Holland as Vettori's replacement at UFC 256. 

John Allan and Roman Dolidze were originally scheduled to meet at UFC 255 in a light heavyweight bout. They were eventually rescheduled for this event.

A bantamweight bout between Cody Stamann and Merab Dvalishvili was expected to take place at this event. However, it was announced on October 22 that Stamann pulled out due to undisclosed reasons. He was replaced by Raoni Barcelos. The new booking fell through on November 19, as it was revealed that Barcelos was removed from the contest due to a medical suspension related to his latest bout at UFC on ESPN: Santos vs. Teixeira.

A featherweight bout between Gabriel Benítez and Justin Jaynes was initially scheduled for UFC Fight Night: Felder vs. dos Anjos a month earlier, but the pairing was postponed after Benítez tested positive for COVID-19. The matchup was left intact and took place at this event.

Also scheduled for UFC Fight Night: Felder vs. dos Anjos, a bantamweight bout between Louis Smolka and José Alberto Quiñónez was cancelled after Smolka pulled out of their fight as a result of ill-effects from his weight cut on the day of the event. They were then rescheduled for this event.

Maryna Moroz was expected to face Taila Santos in a women's flyweight bout at this event. However, it was announced on November 18 that Moroz had to pull out and Montana De La Rosa would be her replacement. Just hours before the event, the UFC decided to remove the fight after one of De La Rosa's cornermen tested positive for COVID-19. Santos was then rescheduled to face Gillian Robertson two weeks later at UFC Fight Night: Thompson vs. Neal.

A women's bantamweight bout between former UFC Women's Bantamweight Championship challenger Bethe Correia and Wu Yanan was expected to take place at this event. However, due to visa issues, they were rescheduled for UFC Fight Night: Holloway vs. Kattar on January 16, 2021.

At the weigh-ins, former interim UFC Light Heavyweight Championship challenger Ovince Saint Preux weighed in at 207.5 pounds, one and a half pounds over the light heavyweight non-title fight limit. His bout proceeded at a catchweight and he was fined 20% of his individual purse, which went to his opponent Jamahal Hill.

Along with the cancellation of the De La Rosa/Santos bout, two other fights were also removed from the event – a featherweight bout between Nate Landwehr and Movsar Evloev, as well as a flyweight bout between Cody Durden and Jimmy Flick. The former was due to Evloev testing positive for COVID-19. The latter was due to a non-COVID related medical issue with Durden, before being rescheduled for UFC Fight Night: Thompson vs. Neal.

Results

Bonus awards
The following fighters received $50,000 bonuses.
Fight of the Night: Marvin Vettori vs. Jack Hermansson 
Performance of the Night: Gabriel Benítez and Jordan Leavitt

See also 

 List of UFC events
 List of current UFC fighters
 2020 in UFC

References 

UFC on ESPN
2020 in mixed martial arts
December 2020 sports events in the United States
2020 in sports in Nevada
Mixed martial arts in Las Vegas
Sports competitions in Las Vegas